The Aurora Awards for Fan Achievement is a section in the annual Aurora Awards which are granted by the Canadian SF and Fantasy Association and SFSF Boreal Inc. Several categories of awards for Fan Achievement have been granted over the years for both English-language and French-language fans. The first Fan Award was the Aurora Award for Fan Achievement, first granted in 1986. Since then, several categories have been created, with 4 still currently being given. In 2017 no awards for Fan Achievement in any anglophone categories were given.

Aurora Award for Fan Achievement

This award was first granted in 1986 as a general category to recognize any fan-related works in the previous calendar year. This was discontinued in 1989, and replaced with more specific categories.

Winners and nominees

  *   Winners and joint winners

Aurora Award for the Best Fan Writing & Publications

An award specifically for fanzines was created in 1989, and is still an ongoing category in the Aurora Awards. It was called the Award for Best Fanzine Achievement from 1989 until 1995. In 1996 it took on the name Award for Best Fan Achievement (Fanzine) and held it until 2002, and again from 2008 until 2010. In 2003, the award was renamed the Award for Best Fan Achievement (Publication), to encompass a greater scope until 2007. In 2011, the name was changed again to the Award for Best Fan Publication. In 2008, 2011 and 2014, no award was given, due to insufficient nominees. In 2018, the award names was broadened again to the Award for Best Fan Writing and Publications.

Winners and nominees

  *   Winners and joint winners

Aurora Award for Best Fan Organizational

An award specifically for achievements in organizing conventions was created in 1989, and is still an ongoing category in the Aurora Awards. In 1997 its name became Award for Best Fan Achievement (Organizational). In 2011 the name of this award changed to Award for Best Fan Organizational, with achievement left implied.

Winners and nominees

  *   Winners and joint winners

Aurora Award for the Best Fan Related Work

An award covering other achievements not related to the other categories was created in 1989, and is still an ongoing category in the Aurora Awards. In 1997 the name of the prize became Award for Best Fan Achievement (Other). In 2011 the name changed simply to Award for Best Fan Other. In 2013 the name of the award was changed to match that of the professional award, to Award for Best Fan Related Work.

Winners and nominees

  *   Winners and joint winners

Fanédition

When the Aurora Awards combined with the Boréal Awards in 2011, the previous category for French-language fan works under the Boréal Awards was continued, and the other Aurora categories became open only to English-language fans. This is currently the only category for fans under the Aurora-Boréal Awards given by the SFSF Boréal. No award was given in 2013.

Winners and nominees

  *   Winners and joint winners

Aurora Award for Best Fan Music

An award specifically for achievements in filking was created in 2010, due to the high popularity of the music form at the time among the Canadian SF community, as the Award for Best Fan Filk. In 2014 this name was changed to Award for Best Fan Music, to broaden the category. In 2016, this category was discontinued and absorbed back into the Award for Best Fan Related Work.

Winners and nominees

  *   Winners and joint winners

References

External links
 Prix Aurora Awards/CSFFA website

Fan Achievement